Kritika: Explorations in Russian and Eurasian History is a quarterly peer-reviewed academic journal published by Slavica Publishers. It covers the history and culture of Russia and Eurasia. The editors-in-chief are Andrew Jenks (California State University), Susan Morrissey (University of California, Irvine), and Willard Sunderland (University of Cincinnati).

Abstracting and indexing
The journal is abstracted and indexed in:
Arts and Humanities Citation Index
Current Contents/Arts and Humanities
EBSCO databases
Modern Language Association Database
Scopus

References

External links

History journals
Publications established in 2000
Historiography of Russia
Quarterly journals
English-language journals